Jorge Jaramillo (born 17 August 1956) is a Colombian former swimmer who competed in the 1972 Summer Olympics and in the 1976 Summer Olympics. He is also the brother of tennis coach Gabe Jaramillo.

References

1956 births
Living people
Colombian male swimmers
Colombian male freestyle swimmers
Male butterfly swimmers
Pan American Games competitors for Colombia
Olympic swimmers of Colombia
Swimmers at the 1972 Summer Olympics
Swimmers at the 1976 Summer Olympics
Swimmers at the 1979 Pan American Games
Competitors at the 1974 Central American and Caribbean Games
Central American and Caribbean Games gold medalists for Colombia
Central American and Caribbean Games medalists in swimming
20th-century Colombian people
21st-century Colombian people